Marciana Marina is a town and comune in the province of Livorno (administrative region of Tuscany, Italy), one of the most important towns of Elba Island.  
It is situated at sea level, with nearly 2.000 inhabitants.

There is a small marina (Circolo della Vela Marciana Marina), two small beaches and an old Torre Medicea, built to protect the city in the past from the frequent pirate invasion.

The promenade going from the old part of the city (called Il Cotone) to the Torre Medicea has preserved the original architectonical and urbanistic features of the 18th century.

References

External links 
 

Cities and towns in Tuscany
Elba
Populated coastal places in Italy